is a Japanese manga series written by Kyō Shirodaira and Arihide Sano, and illustrated by Ren Saizaki. It was serialized in Square Enix's Monthly Shōnen Gangan from July 2009 to March 2013, with its chapters collected in ten tankōbon volumes. A 24-episode anime television series adaptation by Bones aired from October 2012 to March 2013. The anime series was licensed by Aniplex of America in North America and by Madman Entertainment in Australia.

Plot
The story revolves around Mahiro Fuwa, a teenage high school student whose younger step-sister Aika (who was also the longtime girlfriend of his childhood friend Yoshino Takigawa) was mysteriously murdered along with their parents one year before. Mahiro is contacted by Hakaze Kusaribe, the leader of the Kusaribe clan who was left stranded on an unknown deserted island by her followers, and agrees to help Hakaze in exchange for her help to find out the culprit responsible for the tragic death of his family. Upon learning of his friend's intentions, Yoshino joins him on his quest to stand up against the rest of the Kusaribe clan who intends to awaken the "Tree of Exodus" whose power can bring ruin to the entire world.

Several dialogues and plot elements in Zetsuen no Tempest pay homage to two works of William Shakespeare, Hamlet and The Tempest, which are two stories about retribution, albeit with completely opposing outcomes.

Characters

Main characters

The main viewpoint character of the series. Yoshino is Mahiro's childhood best friend who joins his quest to stop the Tree of Exodus in exchange for the means to avenge for the death of his family. Just like Mahiro, Yoshino cannot overcome Aika's death as he was her boyfriend, a fact he always kept a secret from Mahiro by her request. Yoshino has a more calm and collected character in contrast to Mahiro's reckless behavior, resorting to manipulation and deceit when needed. At the end of the series he finally accepted Aika's death and formalize his relationship with Hakaze as a means to move on and honor Aika's last wish.
Yoshino's setup and behavior includes allusions to Horatio from Hamlet, who is the eponymous protagonist's closest friend and confidant. It also includes allusions to Ariel from The Tempest, who works behind the scenes and serves as the magician's primary means of communication and obtaining information.

A typical high school student and the son of a wealthy entrepreneur, Mahiro is Aika's step-brother and Yoshino's best friend since elementary school. Mahiro's family—consisting of his father, mother, and Aika—were all found dead one year before the beginning of the series. In exchange for help with finding the culprit responsible for killing Aika, Mahiro agrees with Hakaze's plan to stop the resurrection of the Tree of Exodus with Yoshino's help. With little care for the destiny of the world, Mahiro's only desire is to locate and kill the murderer of his family, especially for Aika's sake. Though he is not related to Aika by blood, Mahiro claims he never had any romantic feelings for her, even if his actions imply otherwise.
Mahiro's setup and behavior includes allusions to Prince Hamlet, as just like the main character from Shakespeare's tragedy Hamlet, he is prone to abandon all morals and reason for the sake of exacting his revenge. It also includes allusions to Laertes, the brother of Hamlet's beloved Ophelia who also seeks revenge for the deaths of his father and sister.

Killed one year before, along with her parents, Aika was Mahiro's stepsister and Yoshino's girlfriend who also attended high school at the time of her death. Despite already being dead, both of them are still far from overcoming her loss, with Mahiro determined to avenge her at all costs and Yoshino still claiming he has a lover. Aika is a crucial character along with the main protagonists, it is hinted that she is the one who is the key to many unanswered mysteries surrounding them. It is revealed when Hakaze time travels to a time prior to Aika's death that she was actually the "Magician of Exodus", who, after learning of the future described by Hakaze, decided to take her parents' and her own life to save the world having easily restrained Hakaze who tried to stop her. Her powers were transferred to Megumu Hanemura upon her death.
Aika's character is based on Sycorax, also from The Tempest, which is a deceased character who appears in flashbacks and defines several of the relationships in the play, and Ophelia from Hamlet whose brother gets frenzied by his drive for revenge after her death.

The leader of the Kusaribe Clan also known as the "Magician of Genesis" with the task of protecting the "Tree of Genesis" which is the source of the magic used by her clan. Betrayed by her aide Samon, who intends to halt the Tree of Genesis' advent by having the Tree of Exodus resurrected first, she is left stranded in a barrel by her former comrades which was washed ashore of a desert island. She uses the last remains of her magic to create a pair of wooden dolls with one of them thrown inside a bottle to the sea and the other in her possession. The doll is found by Mahiro, and she uses it to communicate with him, giving him and Yoshino instructions to confront the Kusaribe Clan and prevent the return of the Tree of Exodus. Hakaze also develops romantic feelings for Yoshino, but refrains from confessing to him upon his claim that he already has a girlfriend, unaware that said girl is the late Aika. At the end of the series, she enters into a relationship with Yoshino.
Hakaze's setup and behavior includes allusions to Prospero, the main character from Shakespeare's play The Tempest, who is a duke with magical power. His brother betrays him and he escapes with his daughter to an island. On this island he makes plans to gain his dukedom back from his brother.

Kusaribe clan

Hakaze's former aide who usurped her position as the leader of the Kusaribe clan with the intention of awakening the Tree of Exodus to prevent the advent of the Tree of Genesis. Later it is revealed that he did so because he knows that upon fully awakening, the Tree of Genesis will recreate the world, fearing that by doing so, all beings previously created (including mankind) may be destroyed.

Samon's right hand man and one of the best magicians of the Kusaribe Clan. He fights armed with a spear.

Samon's subordinate and mage of the Kusaribe clan. He is very smart and believes in the reason of the world. He suspected Yoshino as the real "Magician of Exodus" rather than Hanemura due to his suspicious participation in certain events.

Other characters

The real current "Magician of Exodus". His powers started manifesting by the time of Aika's death when he was chosen by the Tree of Exodus to replace her and got stronger when the Kusaribe Clan tried to revive it. Unlike the members of the Kusaribe Clan, who are capable only of healing and defensive magic, Megumu's magic is solely focused on destruction and does not need any offerings to be activated. He first appears before Yoshino and Hakaze while looking for the Tree of Exodus, and despite Hanemura is labeled as the greatest threat to her, and was suspicious of being the one who killed Aika, Hakaze decides to train him to ensure that he has the strength to stop the Tree of Genesis should her fears that all mankind will be destroyed when it fully awakens are confirmed. Megumu claims he had a girlfriend, whom he claims is his alibi for the time of Aika's death, but was dumped by her recently. He is unsure if he should save the world for his girlfriend because it might seem uncool. Frauline tracks down his former girlfriend's number and address for him. As the Magician of Exodus, he eventually defeats the Tree of Genesis after the Tree of Exodus was revived.

A Japanese agent working under Takumi to investigate Mahiro and his connection with Hakaze. At first, she finds Yoshino and questions him about Mahiro's whereabouts, but then later makes a deal with him concerning his friend. She is the first person to whom Yoshino confesses that Aika was his girlfriend.

A member of the Kusaribe clan that left to avoid conflict because he dislikes fighting. As the only one Hakaze can really trust, she left him a powerful talisman created from a MP5 sub-machine gun with the power to stop the Tree of Exodus. Currently Junichirou is attending college and true to his pacifist nature; while he is unable to use any magic, he has the ability to deflect attacks of Kusaribe magic, dropping them into the ground should they try to hit him, in a similar fashion to a Judo throw. It is said that not even Hakaze can break through his defenses, leaving his enemies with no options but to give up or to collapse by exhaustion. He is also very perceptive, quickly realizing when Hakaze falls in love with Yoshino.
He has an extreme fetish for women's breasts, which comes up in conversation against the dramatic mood usually set in the anime.

A high-ranking government official who possesses knowledge about magic due to his ancestor's ties with the Kusaribe Clan. Appointed to deal with the matter of the Tree of Exodus, he falls from grace after all the deaths caused by the Tree of Genesis and starts working together with Samon to look for ways to learn more about the truth behind both trees and their respective magicians including the real threat they can pose to mankind. Due to the government's dire need of knowledge about magic in order to deal with the Tree of Genesis, he was shortly promoted back to his former position.

Mahiro's new girlfriend who appeared in the last chapter of the manga.

Media

Manga
Blast of Tempest is written by Kyō Shirodaira and Arihide Sano, and illustrated by Ren Saizaki. It was serialized in Square Enix's Monthly Shōnen Gangan from July 10, 2009 to March 12, 2013. Two additional chapters were published in the magazine on April 12 and October 12, 2013. Square Enix collected its chapters in ten tankōbon volumes, released from February 22, 2010 to November 22, 2013.

Volume list

Anime
The anime began airing on MBS (Animeism block) on October 5, 2012. The anime was simulcast with English subtitles on Crunchyroll. It has been licensed by Aniplex of America in North America and by Madman Entertainment in Australia. For episodes 1–12, the opening theme is "Spirit Inspiration" by Nothing's Carved in Stone while the ending theme is "happy endings" by Kana Hanazawa.

Episode list

References

External links 
  
  
 

2012 anime television series debuts
Anime series based on manga
Animeism
Aniplex
Bones (studio)
Comics about magic
Dark fantasy anime and manga
Gangan Comics manga
Mainichi Broadcasting System original programming
Manga adapted into television series
Muse Communication
Mystery anime and manga
Orphans in fiction
Shōnen manga
Square Enix franchises
Fiction about suicide
TBS Television (Japan) original programming
Television shows written by Mari Okada